Blagomir Mitrev (born 28 May 1972) is a Bulgarian former footballer who played as a midfielder. He most recently served as manager of Vereya.

Club career
Mitrev spent his entire career in Bulgaria, earning a silver medal with Neftochimic in 1997. He also collected 8 caps for the junior and made 1 appearance for the senior national team. Following his retirement from the game, he has been involved in various official capacities with Beroe and Neftochimic. He also served as an assistant to Ivan Vutov at Santos from Ouagadougou in Burkina Faso.

Coaching career
On 6 October 2017, Mitrev was appointed as manager of Neftochimic. In January 2018, he was announced as the new head coach of Vereya, succeeding Ilian Iliev.

References

External links
Player Profile at National-Football-Teams

1972 births
Living people
Bulgarian footballers
Bulgarian football managers
Association football midfielders
Sportspeople from Stara Zagora
PFC Beroe Stara Zagora players
Neftochimic Burgas players
First Professional Football League (Bulgaria) players
Bulgaria international footballers